Jithendra or Jeetendra is a common first name  in India.

Jitendra is derived from two words jeet + indra which means the one who has won Indra. The word 'Jitendra' may have originated from 'Jitendriya' which means "one who has conquered the senses". It is also one of the names of Gautama Buddha, and Hanuman.

Notable people bearing this name include:
 Jeetendra, Indian film actor
 Jeetendra Singh Bundela, Indian politician of Bharatiya Janata Party
 Jitendra Abhisheki, Indian classical music performer
 Jitendra Awhad, Indian politician
 Jitendra Durga Maharaj, Fijian sports administrator
 Jitendra Jatashankar Rawal, Indian astrophysicist
 Jitendra Joshi, Indian Marathi actor
 Jitendra Karki, Nepalese cricketer
 Jitendra Kumar Bablu Bhaiya, Indian politician
 Jeetendra Madnani (born 1978), better known as Jeet, Indian actor
 Jitendra Malik, Professor at the University of California, Berkeley
 Jitendra Mishra, Film maker & promoter
 Jitendra Narayan, the Maharaja of Cooch-Behar, India
 Jitendra Nath Gohain, Indian surgeon
 Jitendra Nath Mohanty, professor of Philosophy
 Jitendra Patel, Canadian cricketer
 Jitendra Prasada, Indian politician
 Jitendra Redkar, Omani cricketer 
 Jitendra Singh, Indian politician of Indian National Congress
 Jitendra Singh, Indian politician of Bharatiya Janata Party

Indian masculine given names